Dark Interval  is a 1950 British crime film directed by Charles Saunders, starring Zena Marshall, Andrew Osborn and John Barry.

Cast
Zena Marshall as Sonia Jordan
Andrew Osborn as Walter Jordan
John Barry as Trevor
John Le Mesurier as Cedric, the butler
Mona Washbourne
Wallas Eaton		
Charmian Innes

References

External links
 

1950 films
1950 crime films
British crime films
Films directed by Charles Saunders
British black-and-white films
1950s English-language films
1950s British films